Ilmari R. Salminen (21 September 1902 – 5 January 1986) was a Finnish long-distance runner, winner of the 10,000 metres at the 1936 Summer Olympics.

Salminen became one of the best long-distance runners in the 1930s when he began his international athletics career in 1934 by winning the 10,000 m and taking bronze in 5000 m at the first European Championships in Turin, thus becoming a main favorite at the Olympic 10,000 m run.

On the first day of competitions in the Berlin Olympics, Salminen won the 10,000 m final before compatriots Arvo Askola and Volmari Iso-Hollo. Salminen managed to hold off Askola by a margin of 0.2 seconds. In the 5000 m final a few days later, Salminen finished in sixth place.

In the next season, Salminen ran a new 10,000 m world record of 30:05.6. He also ran a new world record in six miles. Salminen finished his international career by winning the gold medal in 10,000 m at the 1938 European Championships and retired from athletics after the next season. He later became a sports official and headed the organizing committee of the 1952 Summer Olympics in Helsinki.

References

1902 births
1986 deaths
People from Elimäki
People from Uusimaa Province (Grand Duchy of Finland)
Finnish male long-distance runners
Olympic athletes of Finland
Olympic gold medalists for Finland
Athletes (track and field) at the 1936 Summer Olympics
World record setters in athletics (track and field)
European Athletics Championships medalists
Medalists at the 1936 Summer Olympics
Olympic gold medalists in athletics (track and field)
Sportspeople from Kymenlaakso